Marin Čilić was the two-time defending champion, but withdrew before the tournament started due to an arm injury.

Guillermo García-López won the title, defeating Andreas Seppi in the final, 7–6(7–4), 6–3.

Seeds

 Ivo Karlović (second round)
 Adrian Mannarino (second round)
 Guillermo García-López (champion)
 Gilles Müller (second round)
 Andreas Seppi (final)
 Mikhail Youzhny (quarterfinals)
 Viktor Troicki (quarterfinals)
 Marcel Granollers (semifinals)

Draw

Finals

Top half

Bottom half

Qualifying

Seeds

 Aljaž Bedene (second round)
 Farrukh Dustov (second round)
 Michael Berrer (qualified)
 Norbert Gombos (qualifying competition)
 Matthias Bachinger (qualified)
 Illya Marchenko (qualified)
 Frank Dancevic (qualified)
 Kimmer Coppejans (first round)

Qualifiers

Qualifying draw

First qualifier

Second qualifier

Third qualifier

Fourth qualifier

References
 Main Draw
 Qualifying Draw

PBZ Zagreb Indoors - Singles
2015 Singles
2015 PBZ Zagreb Indoors